The 2022 World Shotgun Championships were held from 19 September to 12 October 2022 in Osijek, Croatia. The championships are a major qualification event for the 2024 Olympic Games, with quota places for the Games being distributed in both men's and women's individual trap and skeet competitions.

Competition schedule
The competition schedule was as follows:

Senior medalists

Men

Women

Mixed

Junior medalists

Men

Women

Mixed

Medal tables

Seniors

Juniors

Olympic quotas

References

ISSF World Shooting Championships
World Shotgun Championships
Shooting
2022 in Croatian sport
Shooting competitions in Croatia
September 2022 sports events in Croatia
October 2022 sports events in Croatia